Skeletochronology is a technique used to determine the individual, chronological ages of vertebrates by counting lines of arrested, annual growth, also known as LAGs, within Skeletal tissues. Within the annual bone growth specimens, there are broad and narrow lines. Broad lines represent the growth period and narrow lines represent a growth pause. These narrow lines are what characterises one growth year, therefore make it suitable to determine the age of the specimen. Not all bones grow at the same rate and the individual growth rate of a bone changes over a lifetime, therefore periodic growth marks can take irregular patterns. This indicates significant chronological events in an individual's life. The use of bone as a biomaterial is useful in investigating structure-property relationships. In addition to current research in skeletochronology, the ability of bone to adapt and change its structure to the external environment provides potential for further research in bone histomorphometry in the future. Amphibians and Reptiles are commonly aged determined, using this method, because they undergo discrete annual activity cycles such as winter dormancy or metamorphosis, however it cannot be used for all species of bony animals. The different environmental and biological factors that influence bone growth and development can become a barrier in determining age as a complete record may be rare.

Method 
The extraction and study of bone tissue varies depending on the taxa involved and the amount of material available. However, skeletochronology best focuses on LAGs that encircle the entire shaft in a ring form and have a regular pattern of deposition. These growths show a repeated pattern, 'described mathematically as a time series'. The tissues are divided using a microtome, stained with haematoxylin to be then viewed under a microscope. The analysis is frequently performed on dry bones with the additional application of alcohol or congelated preservation if needed, as the aim is to enhance the optical contrast which results from different physical properties to light.

It is important to consider potential problems when selecting particular bones to study. If there is a weak optical contrast, it makes counting the arrested growth rings difficult and often inaccurate. There is also a possible presence of additional growth marks that are created to supplement weaker areas of growth. In these circumstances, alternative bones must be considered that may present more accurate data. Another case is the doubling of lines of arrested growth where two closely adjacent twin lines can be seen. However, when the pattern is widespread for several age classes in that species, then the twin LAGs can be counted as a single year growth. The most common issue to arise is the destruction of bone from biological processes, most frequently discovered in mammals and Birds. This causes age to be significantly underestimated. Over the lifespan of an individual, bone is constantly being reconstructed as specialised cells remove and deposit bone leading to a constant renewal of the bone material. The continuous resorption and deposition leaves gaps in the record of growth and missing bone tissue is a case at any stage of a vertebrate's life cycle; 'complete specimens that allow precise identification are extremely rare'.

Therefore, to account for any missing bone tissues in a specimen, retrocalculation of skeletal age is to be completed.

Three approaches can be identified in retro calculating.

1)    Retro calculating of skeletal age which involves identifying major and minor axe of the bone's cross section and circumferences of bones calculated using Ramanujan's formula

.

2)    Retro calculating through Arithmetic estimate which requires the sampling of several parts of other bone and making an estimate of the number of missing tissues

3)    Retro calculating by superimposition in an Ontogenic series which requires a complete growth record on one individual so that their histological cross sections can be overlaid and reconstructed on another individual.

Cases of discoveries

Frog Rana pipiens Schreber of Southwestern Quebec; Schroeder and Baskett, 1968 
This was the first use of skeletochronology as a method of age determination in vertebrates as well as an assessment of the validity of the procedure. This study was performed on 42 bullfrogs of known age in Southwestern Quebec . It was believed that the narrow marks of growth was a result of periods of arrested growth during the winter period and the broad, translucent marks represented favourable periods in the environment. Frogs, in the study, that hat no growth marks were shown to belong to the age group that had not Hibernated since undergoing metamorphosis. Frogs that had two growth marks belonged to the age groups which as lived over two winters since their metamorphosis. Upon completing the study, skeletochronology was viewed as a technique of age determination that was accurate and applicable for future studies. It showed that several distinct populations of one species can be studied at the same time. This meant that different generations in populations can be compared as well as different demographic parameters i.e. studying a population in high, dry ground and comparing with a population in low, wet areas. This study also showed that different species in the same area can also be simultaneously studied.

Modern and fossil tortoises of Nebraska and Florida; D.J Ehret, 2007 
This study focused on the age of tortoises between the Eocene–Oligocene boundary event that saw an increase in the modern Gopher tortoise population from the now extinct Stylemys nebrascensis tortoise. Samples of shells and skeletons of Gopherus were collected from Florida and fossil tortoises were collected from the 'turtle-oreodont' fossil zone in Nebraska. This study demonstrated retro calculating through superimposition as similar bones grow at a similar rate, regardless of which side of the body it comes from. The Humerus bone proved to be most reliable in terms of number of LAGs with least amount of reconstruction. Results showed how and when the modern tortoise appeared in the fossil record, with both species reaching their adult sizes over 40 years. This allowed an understanding in the carrying capacity of the habitat, sexual maturity and individual lifespan. It also confirmed that Gopherus species most adapted to the Badlands habitat due to faster growing individuals and their shorter time to reach sexual maturity.

Mitsjama salamander of Japan; E. Kyoko & M. Masafumi, 2002 
This study was the first estimation of age structure for amphibians using skeletochronologically. E. Kyoko & M. Masafumi's study of Salamanders involved analysing age at first reproduction and growth patterns as local populations were declining. Each individual was marked by toe clippings while their body size was measured, with the study beginning in 1983. Results showed that male salamander growth decreased greatly after reaching sexual maturity while females grew larger as they do not reach sexual maturity as early as the males. They also reported that the post metamorphic survival rate was low, requiring early maturation and participation in breeding in order to increase population size.

Green sea turtles in Hawaii; L.R. Goshe et al., 2016 
This study of body lengths and growth mark deposition on Green sea turtles used skeletochronology to reduce time and labour that was previously required in mark and recapture studies, allowing for prior growth rates to be back-calculated. As commonly used in reptiles, the humerus held the highest amount of cortical bone and became the focus of the study. The results showed negative growth rates when turtles were facing low food conditions. It also became the first study to confirm the assumption that LAG deposition occurred in Spring for green turtles.

Asiatic wild ass in Asia, C. Nacarine-Meneses et al., 2016 
This study recorded longevity, growth rate and age at maturity in the evolution of horse based on the evidence provided from the Asiatic wild ass bone specimens. As this species is morphologically and ecologically similar to the extinct stenoid horses, it provided an understanding towards their evolution. In mammals, the hard bone tissue is heavily influenced by external environmental conditions and resource availability which was proved by the different growth rates between wild and captive ass. Results also showed that the species became sexually mature a year before their final growth arrest.

Rana holtzi, endemic frog of Turkey, F.M Guarine & U.C Erismis, 2008 
This study used phalangeal skeletochronology to assess ages of different populations in temperate subtropical and tropical areas. This was useful in understanding the causes of the population variations of the differing regions especially for a highly endangered species, as the procedure was non-lethal unlike most other bone analyses. During the study, there was a high frequency of double LAGs mainly among males due to the severe drought that had occurred in the 2000-2001 summer. This would have affected their feeding opportunities and thus deprived bone growth. The results showed a positive correlation between body size and age, with a greater variation in females, who would live, on average, an additional year than the males.

Native subtropical frog species in South America, A.J.C Brum et al. 2019 
This study was the first to record growth rings for 11 native subtropical frog species as the environment of this area had a high range of climatic seasonality. This had created a barrier for analysing age through bone growth as several species had irregular growth lines based on environmental variables. However, the study showed that under natural conditions, LAG formation was synchronised with the changing climate, as growth was delayed in the winter as the frogs underwent hibernation. It also proved that skeletochronology was effective for both phalanges and long bones in the South American frog species.

Future progress 
Skeletochronology has potential to expand further to other genus' as it has already provided a basis for future research in the evolution of life histories within their environmental context. Yet Climate change has become a major threat to biodiversity estimating to lose 40% of all species in the next decade. As this technique of age determination is used most popularly in amphibians and reptiles, it faces several barriers with climate change. It is recognised as the biggest threat to amphibian biodiversity. Most amphibians have highly complex lives, requiring different environmental variables as they mature. Knowledge and understanding of the welfare needs and sustainability of amphibians and their unique habitats is limited. Furthermore, there lacks evidence-based practices and guidance when keeping them in captive care. Therefore, further studies must be developed to provide options for conserving such complicated range of species.

References

Dating methods